Rochester is a census-designated place (CDP) that comprises the central village of the town of Rochester, Windsor County, Vermont, United States.  As of the 2010 census, the population of the CDP was 299, compared to 1,139 for the entire town of Rochester.

Geography
Rochester is located in extreme northwest Windsor County, along the White River. Vermont Route 100 passes through the village, heading north to Hancock, Granville, and Warren, and south to Stockbridge. Vermont Route 73 leads west from Rochester, crossing the Green Mountains to Brandon.

References

Census-designated places in Vermont
Census-designated places in Windsor County, Vermont